New Consolidated Gold Fields Ltd Estonian Branch (commonly known as Goldfields) was an oil shale company located in Kohtla-Nõmme, Estonia. It was a subsidiary of Consolidated Gold Fields.

New Consolidated Gold Fields began oil shale research and development in the late 1920s in England.  In 1930 it began construction of the shale oil extraction complex at Kohtla-Nõmme. It consisted of a shale oil extraction plant, a crushing mill, laboratory, power plant, office building and services facilities, as also housing for 30 workers, dispensary and sauna.  The first plant was built in 1931. The plant was equipped with eight rotating retorts (Davidson retorts).  Each of these retorts was capable of processing 15 tonnes of oil shale per day.  This facility continued to operate until 1961.  In 1934 the company doubled its production by building the second shale oil extraction plant.

In 1934, Eesti Kiviõli and New Consolidated Gold Fields established the service station chain Trustivapaa Bensiini (now: Teboil) in Finland. During 1940 this chain sold more shale-oil-derived gasoline than did the entire conventional gasoline market in Estonia. In 1937, the company opened the Kohtla underground mine.

After the occupation of Estonia by the Soviet Union, the company was nationalized in 1940. The Kohtla-Nõmme shale oil extraction complex continued to operate until 1961. The underground mine stayed operational until 2001.

See also

 Eesti Küttejõud
 Eestimaa Õlikonsortsium
 Esimene Eesti Põlevkivitööstus
 Oil shale in Estonia

References

Bibliography 

 
 
 

Oil shale companies of Estonia
Ida-Viru County
Synthetic fuel companies
Non-renewable resource companies established in 1930
Non-renewable resource companies disestablished in 1940
1930 establishments in Estonia
Defunct energy companies of Estonia
Defunct mining companies
Defunct oil companies
Companies nationalised by the Soviet Union
1940 disestablishments in Estonia